Stranded in Suburbia is Melissa McClelland's second album. The album was released in 2004 in Canada by the Orange Record Label.

Track listing 
"Good as Gold" (4:55)
"White Lies (Stranded in Suburbia)" (2:49)
"Pretty Blue" (4:47)
"Jaded" (3:51)
"Glimpse into Hell" (3:18)
"Rooftop" (5:11)
"Factory" (2:39)
"Picture Postcard" (3:39)
"Encinitas Rainstorm" (4:41)
"Little Birds" (4:26)
"Blue Farewell" (5:55)
"Smoke Signals" (4:45)
"Jaded [Ogilve/Fu Remix]" (4:00)

The CD contains enhanced CD content - interview clips, live performance footage, video clip of "White Lies" and more.

All songs written by Melissa McClelland except:
 "Encinitas Rainstorm" and "Jaded", co-written by Luke Doucet
 "Factory" written by Bruce Springsteen

2004 albums
Melissa McClelland albums